Patrick Stapleton may refer to:

Patrick J. Stapleton Jr. (1924–2001), U.S. politician in Pennsylvania, father of Patrick J. Stapleton III
Pat Stapleton (ice hockey) (1940–2020), Canadian ice hockey player
Paddy Stapleton (born 1985), Irish hurler